Minuscule 268 (in the Gregory-Aland numbering), ε 1163 (Soden), is a Greek minuscule manuscript of the New Testament, on parchment. Paleographically it has been assigned to the 12th century. It has marginalia.

Description 

The codex contains the text of the four Gospels on 396 parchment leaves. The text is written in two columns per page, in 25 lines per page.

There is also a division according to the smaller Ammonian Sections (Matthew 356, Mark 234 – the last section in 16:9, Luke 342, John 232), with references to the Eusebian Canons (written below Ammonian Section numbers).

Incipits and pictures were added by a later hand.

Text 

The Greek text of the codex is a representative of the Byzantine text-type. Aland placed it in Category V.

According to the Claremont Profile Method it represent the textual family Π268 in Luke 1 and Luke 20. In Luke 20 no profile was made. It creates textual pair with Minuscule 787.

History 

The manuscripts was added to the list of New Testament manuscripts by Scholz (1794-1852).
It was examined and described by Paulin Martin. C. R. Gregory saw the manuscript in 1885.

The manuscript is currently housed at the Bibliothèque nationale de France (Gr. 73) at Paris.

See also 

 List of New Testament minuscules
 Biblical manuscript
 Textual criticism

References

Further reading 

 

Greek New Testament minuscules
12th-century biblical manuscripts
Bibliothèque nationale de France collections